James Boyd (November 30, 1930 – January 25, 1997) was a boxer from Rocky Mount, North Carolina, United States, who competed in the Light Heavyweight division during his career as an amateur. Boyd won the gold medal in the 1956 Olympic Games in Melbourne, Australia.

Amateur career
Boyd was the National Golden Gloves Light Heavyweight Champion of 1956, and the Olympic Light Heavyweight (179 pounds) Gold Medalist at the 1956 Melbourne Olympic Games.

Pro career
Boyd turned pro in 1959 and had limited success.  He retired in 1962 having won 2, lost 2, and drawn 3, with 1 KO.

References

External links
 

1930 births
1997 deaths
Sportspeople from Rocky Mount, North Carolina
Boxers from North Carolina
Light-heavyweight boxers
Olympic boxers of the United States
Boxers at the 1956 Summer Olympics
American male boxers
Olympic gold medalists for the United States in boxing
Medalists at the 1956 Summer Olympics